Michele Hicks (born June 4, 1973) is an American screen actress and former fashion model who has worked in both film and television.

Career
Her television appearances include Law & Order: Criminal Intent, Law & Order: Special Victims Unit, CSI: NY, Cold Case, The Shield and Heist. She also appeared in the music video for the song "Letting the Cables Sleep" by Bush.

Personal life
Hicks married actor Jonny Lee Miller in June 2008 and they have one son.
Hicks and Miller divorced in 2018.

Filmography

Film

Television

References

External links
 
 

1973 births
Living people
Actresses from New Jersey
Female models from New Jersey
American film actresses
American television actresses
People from Essex County, New Jersey
20th-century American actresses
21st-century American actresses